Micah Potter (born April 6, 1998) is an American professional basketball player for the Utah Jazz of the National Basketball Association (NBA), on a two-way contract with the Salt Lake City Stars of the NBA G League. He played college basketball for the Ohio State Buckeyes and the Wisconsin Badgers.

High school career
Potter attended Mentor High School in Mentor, Ohio and came off the bench until his junior season. He averaged 20.2 points and 9.1 rebounds per game as a junior, earning First Team All-State honors. For his senior season, Potter transferred to Montverde Academy in Montverde, Florida. He averaged 10.7 points and 5.5 rebounds per game and was named team most valuable player. Potter committed to playing college basketball for Ohio State.

College career

Ohio State (2016–2018)

Potter began his freshman season for Ohio State in the starting lineup but was replaced by Trevor Thompson after missing two games with an ankle injury. He averaged 4.1 points and 3.1 rebounds per game as a freshman. Potter suffered a high ankle sprain in the fourth game of his sophomore season and received limited playing time with the emergence of Kaleb Wesson and Keita Bates-Diop. As a sophomore, he averaged 4.1 points and 2.4 rebounds per game. Two days before his junior season, Potter announced that he would transfer from Ohio State.

Wisconsin (2019–2021)
He transferred to Wisconsin and sat out for the 2018–19 season due to transfer rules. Potter also sat out for the next fall semester after his request for immediate eligibility was denied by the National Collegiate Athletic Association. On January 11, 2020, he recorded a junior season-high 24 points and 13 rebounds in a 58–49 win over Penn State. As a junior, he averaged 10.1 points and 6.2 rebounds per game through 21 appearances. Entering his senior season, Potter was named to the Kareem Abdul-Jabbar Award preseason watch list. He averaged 12.5 points and 5.9 rebounds per games and started 20 of 31 games.

Professional career

Sioux Falls Skyforce / Detroit Pistons (2021–2022)
After going undrafted in the 2021 NBA Draft, Potter joined the Miami Heat for the 2021 NBA Summer League and on September 10, he signed a contract with the Heat. He was one of the final cuts in training camp and joined the Sioux Falls Skyforce as an affiliate player. Potter averaged 14.1 points and 10.7 rebounds per game. 

On December 29, 2021, Potter signed a 10-day contract with the Detroit Pistons and returned to Sioux Falls afterwards.

Potter joined the New York Knicks for the 2022 NBA Summer League.

Utah Jazz (2022–present) 
On October 12, 2022, Potter signed a two-way contract with the Utah Jazz.

On January 27, 2023, Potter underwent right elbow surgery and was ruled out for at least four-to-six weeks.

Career statistics

NBA

|-
| style="text-align:left;"| 
| style="text-align:left;"| Detroit
| 3 || 0 || 10.3 || .455 || .000 || 1.000 || 3.0 || .0 || .3 || .3 || 4.0
|- class="sortbottom"
| style="text-align:center;" colspan="2"| Career
| 3 || 0 || 10.3 || .455 || .000 || 1.000 || 3.0 || .0 || .3 || .3 || 4.0

College

|-
| style="text-align:left;"| 2016–17
| style="text-align:left;"| Ohio State
| 30 || 12 || 14.1 || .434 || .333 || .600 || 3.1 || .3 || .3 || .4 || 4.1
|-
| style="text-align:left;"| 2017–18
| style="text-align:left;"| Ohio State
| 29 || 4 || 10.1 || .489 || .300 || .800 || 2.4 || .3 || .2 || .4 || 4.1
|-
| style="text-align:left;"| 2018–19
| style="text-align:left;"| Wisconsin
| style="text-align:center;" colspan="11"|  Redshirt
|-
| style="text-align:left;"| 2019–20
| style="text-align:left;"| Wisconsin
| 21 || 3 || 17.5 || .528 || .451 || .860 || 6.2 || .4 || .4 || 1.0 || 10.1
|-
| style="text-align:left;"| 2020–21
| style="text-align:left;"| Wisconsin
| 31 || 20 || 22.2 || .504 || .386 || .840 || 5.9 || 1.4 || .5 || .7 || 12.5
|- class="sortbottom"
| style="text-align:center;" colspan="2"| Career
| 111 || 39 || 15.9 || .496 || .381 || .794 || 4.3 || .6 || .3 || .6 || 7.6

Personal life
Potter is a Christian. His older brother, Caleb, played baseball for West Virginia and Southern New Hampshire. His younger brother, Noah, plays football for Ohio State. Potter's late grandfather was married to the grandmother of Jon Teske.

Micah married Elle Van Grinsven, a former volleyball player and recent graduate of Loyola University Chicago on June 11, 2021 in Lomira, Wisconsin.

References

External links
Wisconsin Badgers bio
Ohio State Buckeyes bio

1998 births
Living people
American men's basketball players
Basketball players from Ohio
Centers (basketball)
Detroit Pistons players
Montverde Academy alumni
Ohio State Buckeyes men's basketball players
People from Mentor, Ohio
Power forwards (basketball)
Sioux Falls Skyforce players
Undrafted National Basketball Association players
Utah Jazz players
Wisconsin Badgers men's basketball players